Anthony Wilson Thorold (13 June 1825 – 25 July 1895) was an Anglican Bishop of Winchester in the Victorian era. The son of a Church of England priest, he also served as Bishop of Rochester. It was in that role that he travelled throughout North America and met with  leaders of the Church of Jesus Christ of Latter-day Saints. While he wrote a number of devotional books, he is best remembered for having recruited Isabella Gilmore to revive the female diaconate in the Anglican Communion.

Early life
Thorold was the second son of the Reverend Edward Thorold and his wife Mary (née Wilson), and grandson of Sir John Thorold, 9th Baronet (1734–1815). He was educated privately, entering The Queen's College, Oxford in 1843; he graduated B.A. 1847, M.A. 1850, was ordained as a deacon in 1849 and as a priest in 1850. He subsequently received a D.D. by diploma in 1877.

He married Henrietta Greene and followed  his father into a career in the Church of England. He served as vicar of St Giles in the Fields, Curzon Chapel, and St Pancras. His wife died in 1859 and he married secondly to Emily Labouchère, sister of the MP Henry Labouchère. They had three children: Algar Labouchère Thorold (1866–1936), Dorothy, and Sybil (later Countess de la Bédoyère). His descendants through Sybil include his grandson Michael de la Bédoyère and his great-great-grandson, the historian Guy de la Bédoyère.

In 1870 he was elected a member of the first London School Board, representing the Marylebone Division.

His second wife died in 1877, the same year he was made Bishop of Rochester. Thorold's cousin, Edward Trollope, was made suffragan bishop for Nottingham also that same year.

Travels
Thorold had extensive travels, preaching in the United States in the late 19th century. During that time he visited the Church of Jesus Christ of Latter-day Saints at Salt Lake City. He recalled that on 1 September 1884, "We went round the new Mormon Tabernacle, of solid granite, very massively built out of the tithes of the people. It is only one-third finished. Then into the tabernacle now in use, tortoise shape, and capable of holding 7000 people ... we passed the great co-operative store ... and Brigham Young's houses', near which was pointed out Mr. Taylor [presumably John Taylor], a very important and able ruler in the body". Thorold went on to the Great Salt Lake and noted "There is a bathing station here, and almost all the company, gentlemen and ladies, bathed in the sea, which, from the quantity of salt, it is quite impossible to sink".  He travelled on and even reached Alaska before returning home.

Female diaconate
In 1886, he recruited Isabella Gilmore to revive the female diaconate in his diocese. Her initial reluctance, based on her lack of theological training and her lack of knowledge of the deaconess order, was worn down by Thorold. At the end of October 1886, she felt she received a calling during Morning Prayer. She later wrote, "it was just as if God's voice had called me, and the intense rest and joy were beyond words." Gilmore and Bishop Thorold proceeded to plan for an order of deaconesses for the Church of England where the women were to be "a curiously effective combination of nurse, social worker and amateur policemen". In 1887, Gilmore was ordained a deaconess and a training house for other woman was put in place, later to be named Gilmore House in her honour. In her nearly 20 years of service, she re-established the female diaconate in the Anglican Communion.

Final years and legacy
He was translated to the see of Winchester in 1891 (being enthroned on March 3),  where he would live out his days. A prayer survives from this time that is attributed to "Bishop A. W. Thorold, D.D., Lord Bishop of Winchester, England",

Unlike his cousin, Bishop Edward Trollope, Thorold performed little serious scholarship. He did write a number of devotional books, among them The Yoke of Christ (Isbister, London 1884), The Gospel of Christ (Isbister 1884), and  The Claim of Christ on the Young (Isbister, London 1891). Shortly after his death in 1895, C. H. Simpkinson wrote The Life and Work of Bishop Thorold, published by Isbister in 1896. It contained many quotes from Thorold's correspondence and also accounts of his travels.

References

Further reading
C. H. Simpkinson, The Life and Work of Bishop Thorold. London: Isbister, 1896

External links
Bibliographic directory from Project Canterbury

1825 births
1895 deaths
Bishops of Rochester
Bishops of Winchester
19th-century Church of England bishops
Members of the London School Board